The Virginia Slims of Fort Lauderdale is a defunct WTA Tour affiliated women's tennis tournament played from 1971 to 1974. It was held in Fort Lauderdale, Florida in the United States and played on outdoor clay courts.

Past finals

Singles

Doubles

See also
 1973 Virginia Slims of Fort Lauderdale

External links
 WTA Results Archive

Clay court tennis tournaments
 
Virginia Slims tennis tournaments
Virginia Slims of Fort Lauderdale
Recurring sporting events established in 1971
1971 establishments in Florida
1974 disestablishments in Florida
Recurring sporting events disestablished in 1974
Sports in Fort Lauderdale, Florida